Leonid is a Slavic version of the given name Leonidas. The French version is Leonide. 

People with the name include:
Leonid Andreyev (1871–1919), Russian playwright and short-story writer who led the Expressionist movement in the national literature
Leonid Brezhnev (1906–1982), leader of the USSR from 1964 to 1982
Leonid Buryak (b. 1953), USSR/Ukraine-born Olympic-medal-winning soccer player and coach
Leonid Bykov (1928–1979), Soviet and Ukrainian actor, film director, and script writer
Leonid Desyatnikov (b. 1955), Soviet and Russian opera and film composer
Leonid Feodorov (1879–1935), a bishop and Exarch for the Russian Catholic Church, and survivor of the Gulag
Leonid Filatov (1946–2003), Soviet and Russian actor, director, poet, and pamphleteer
Leonid Gaidai, (1923–1993), Soviet comedy film director
Leonid Geishtor (b. 1936), USSR (Belarus)-born Olympic champion Canadian pairs sprint canoer
Leonid Gobyato (1875–1915), Russian lieutenant-general and designer of the modern, man-portable mortar
Leonid Hurwicz (1917–2008), Russian-born American economist and mathematician who shared the 2007 Nobel Prize in Economics
Leonid Ivanov (disambiguation), several people
Leonid Kadeniuk (b. 1951), first and only astronaut of independent Ukraine to fly into outer space
Leonid Kharitonov (singer) (1933–2017), Soviet and Russian bass-baritone singer
Leonid Khrushchev (1917–1943), missing aviator
Leonid Kogan (1924–1982), Soviet and Russian violinist
Leonid Kantorovich (1912–1986) Soviet and Russian mathematician, economist, and only winner from the USSR of the Nobel Prize in Economics
Leonid Kolumbet (b. 1937), Soviet and Ukrainian Olympic cyclist
Leonid Kostandov (1915–1984), Soviet politician
Leonid Krasin (1870–1926), Soviet and Russian engineer and politician
Leonid Kravchuk (1934–2022), Ukrainian politician and first President of Ukraine
Leonid Krupnik (b. 1979), Ukrainian-born American-Israeli former soccer player and current soccer coach
Leonid Kuchma (b. 1938), second President of Ukraine
Leonid Kuravlyov (1936–2022), Soviet and Russian actor
Leonid Levin (b. 1948), Soviet-American computer scientist
Leonid Fyodorovich Myasin, French transliteration: Léonide Massine (1896–1979), Russian choreographer and ballet dancer
Leonid Mezheritski (1930–2007), Soviet and Israeli still-life, portrait and landscape painter
Leonid Moseyev (b. 1952), Soviet and Russian long-distance runner
Leonid Pasternak (1862–1945), Russian Impressionist painter
Leonid Reiman (or Reyman) (b. 1957), Russian businessman and government official, currently Minister of Communications and Information Technologies of the Russian Federation
Leonid Rozhetskin, (1966–20??), Russian-American financier and lawyer who disappeared in 2008; remains found in 2013
Leonid Sagayduk (1929–1998), Soviet swimmer
Leonid Sigal, Russian violinist and conductor
Leonid Sobinov (1872–1934), Russian opera singer
Leonid Stadnyk (1970–2014), Ukrainian man named "world's tallest living man" by Guinness World Records 2008
Leonid Stein (b. 1934), Soviet Grandmaster chess player from Ukraine among the top ten players in the 1960s
Leonid Taranenko (b. 1956), 1980 Olympic weightlifting champion for the Soviet Union
Leonid Teyf, Russian-Israeli businessman
Leonid Toptunov (1960–1986), reactor control engineer killed in the Chernobyl disaster
Leonid Utyosov (Leyzer (Lazar) Vaysbeyn, or Weissbein) (1895–1982), Soviet and Russian jazz singer and comic actor
Leonid Volkov (b. 1980), Russian opposition politician, IT specialist, Alexei Navalny аssociate
Leonid Voskresensky (1913–1965), Soviet rocket engineer and launch director for Sputnik
Leonid Yakubovich (b. 1945), Russian television host
Leonid Zhabotinsky (1938–2016), Soviet weightlifter and Olympic gold medalist

Fictional characters include:
Leonid, the protagonist in Alexander Bogdanov’s 1908 Russian science fiction novel Red StarLeonid, the protagonist in the Labyrinth trilogy of cyberpunk novels written in the late 1990s by Russian science fiction writer Sergei Lukyanenko (Labyrinth of Reflections, False Mirrors, and Transparent Stained-Glass Windows).
Leonid Gorbovsky, in Arkady and Boris Strugatsky's series of science fiction novels set in the Noon Universe
Leonid Kovar, Russian superhero also known as Red Star
Leonid McGill, Manhattan private detective in fiction written by Walter Mosley
Leonid Pavel, Russian nuclear scientist in The Dark Knight Rises''

See also 
 Alvis Leonides, a British air-cooled radial piston aero-engine
 Leonidas (disambiguation)

Ukrainian masculine given names
Russian masculine given names
Bulgarian masculine given names
Macedonian masculine given names
Given names of Greek language origin